The Flat Rock Dam is an earthen dam which stretches across the Schuylkill River. It is part of the Flat Rock Park maintained by Lower Merion Township, Montgomery County, Pennsylvania, and is located off the Schuylkill Expressway in Gladwyne.

History and architectural details
The dam is part of a series of locks and waterway built by the Schuylkill Navigation Company between Port Carbon and Philadelphia in order to carry upstate coal to markets in the city. It created a pool for the canal boats above it and brought water to the Manayunk Reach. Under the supervision of Ariel Cooley, a Massachusetts engineer who was responsible for the design of the Fairmount Dam, the construction of the dam and locks began in 1815 and was completed in 1818.

The Schuylkill River flows through the dam at a rate of roughly 2540 CFS. 

A future hydroelectric project plans to place turbines to generate 1.5 MW of electricity.

References

See also
 
 
 
 
 List of crossings of the Schuylkill River

Dams in Pennsylvania